The 2020 Super Rugby season was the 25th season of Super Rugby, an international men's rugby union competition organised by SANZAAR involving teams from Argentina, Australia, Japan, New Zealand and South Africa. It is the third tournament in its current 15 team format, the last before the Japanese side the Sunwolves withdraw from the tournament ahead of a new format in 2021. The current champions are the Crusaders, who won their 10th title in 2019.

On 14 March 2020, it was announced that play would be suspended after the conclusion of the weekend's fixtures, due to the COVID-19 pandemic and a travel restriction that was announced by New Zealand earlier in the day. Replacement regional tournaments would take place thereafter, beginning in June in New Zealand, July in Australia and October in South Africa.

Competition format

15 teams were to partake in the 2020 edition of Super Rugby.

The group stages were to consist of 18 rounds of matches spanning from 31 January 2020 until the beginning of June. Teams were to play 16 matches each across these 18 rounds with two bye weeks built into each of their schedules. Teams were to play each of their conference rivals home and away and then another eight matches against non-conference teams either home or away, but against a minimum of four of the teams in the other conferences.

The winner of each conference would qualify for the Super Rugby finals, along with the next five best teams from all the conferences. The winners of each conference and the best placed team were to host the quarterfinals. It was planned that winners of the quarterfinals would progress to the semifinals, and the winners of the semifinals to the final, but eventually all matches were cancelled (see below).

COVID-19 pandemic

Due to the COVID-19 pandemic, two Sunwolves matches were moved to Australia from Japan. It was announced 12 March that although fans would still be admitted for that weekend's fixtures, future rounds held in Australia were to be played behind closed doors. On 14 March, New Zealand announced that all travellers entering the country from outside of the Pacific Islands would be required to self-isolate for 14 days on arrival. As this would have made play logistically difficult, SANZAAR announced that the season would be suspended indefinitely following the completion of the seventh round of fixtures.

Following the suspension, SANZAAR and regional rugby boards proposed regional tournaments to replace the Super Rugby fixtures that were cancelled. On 6 May, New Zealand Rugby announced that a Super Rugby Aotearoa competition, involving the five New Zealand teams, would begin on 13 June. The competition will be contested using a double round robin format, with 20 matches played over 10 weeks. On 27 May, Rugby Australia confirmed Super Rugby AU would begin on 3 July, involving the four Australian sides in the Australian conference and the Western Force, who played in Super Rugby until the 2017 season. The Sunwolves were also in discussions to take part in the Australian competition, but due to travel restrictions were unable to do so. Following this, the club was disbanded on 1 June, with the side having been due to leave Super Rugby at the end of the original 2020 season.

On 16 September, SA Rugby announced a 7 team competition between the four South African Super Rugby sides, plus the Cheetahs from Pro14, and the Griquas and Pumas from the Currie Cup, starting on 10 October. On 18 September, the official details of the Super Rugby Unlocked tournament was announced, with the 7 teams playing each other in a round robin format over the course of 7 weeks, with the domestic Currie Cup competition continuing thereafter.

Standings

Round-by-round

The table below shows each team's progression throughout the season. For each round, their cumulative points total is shown with the overall log position in brackets:

Matches

The fixtures for the 2020 Super Rugby competition were released on 10 September 2019.

Players

Squads

The following 2020 Super Rugby squads have been named:

Top scorers

The top ten try and point scorers during the 2020 Super Rugby season are:

Referees

The following refereeing panel was appointed by SANZAAR for the 2020 Super Rugby season:

References

External links
 Super Rugby websites:
 Official Super Rugby website
 Australia Super Rugby website
 New Zealand Super Rugby website

 
2020
2020 in Argentine rugby union
2020 in Australian rugby union
2019–20 in Japanese rugby union
2020–21 in Japanese rugby union
2020 in New Zealand rugby union
2020 in South African rugby union
2020 rugby union tournaments for clubs
Sports events curtailed and voided due to the COVID-19 pandemic